Rhizocarpon viridiatrum is a species of saxicolous (rock-dwelling), crustose lichen in the family Rhizocarpaceae. It was first described by Franz Xaver Freiherr von Wulfen as Lichen viridiater in 1791. Gustav Wilhelm Körber transferred it to the genus Rhizocarpon in 1855.

References

Rhizocarpaceae
Lichen species
Lichens described in 1791
Taxa named by Franz Xaver von Wulfen